In mathematics, a pullback is either of two different, but related processes: precomposition and fiber-product.  Its dual is a pushforward.

Precomposition

It is such a fundamental process that it is often passed over without mention.

However, it is not just functions that can be "pulled back" in this sense. Pullbacks can be applied to many other objects such as differential forms and their cohomology classes; see

 Pullback (differential geometry)
 Pullback (cohomology)

Fiber-product

The pullback bundle is an example that bridges the notion of a pullback as precomposition, and the notion of a pullback as a Cartesian square. In that example, the base space of a fiber bundle is pulled back, in the sense of precomposition, above.  The fibers then travel along with the points in the base space at which they are anchored: the resulting new pullback bundle looks locally like a Cartesian product of the new base space, and the (unchanged) fiber. The pullback bundle then has two projections: one to the base space, the other to the fiber; the product of the two becomes coherent when treated as a fiber product.

Generalizations and category theory

The notion of pullback as a fiber-product ultimately leads to the very general idea of a categorical pullback, but it has important special cases: inverse image (and pullback) sheaves in algebraic geometry, and pullback bundles in algebraic topology and differential geometry.

See also:
 Pullback (category theory)
 Fibred category
 Inverse image sheaf

Functional analysis

When the pullback is studied as an operator acting on function spaces, it becomes a linear operator, and is known as the transpose or composition operator.  Its adjoint is the push-forward, or, in the context of functional analysis, the transfer operator.

Relationship

See also

References

Mathematical analysis